Manousos is both a Greek surname and a given name. Notable people with the name include:

Savvas Manousos (born 1985), Greek basketball player
Yiorghos Manousos (born 1987), Greek footballer
Manousos Manousakis, Greek film director, producer, screenwriter and actor

Greek-language surnames
Surnames